Günter Kaltenbrunner (born 28 July 1943) is a former Austrian football player and manager. He made four appearances for the Austria national football team between 1962 and 1968. He was coach from SC Eisenstadt in the 1980–81 season. Later he worked for the Bank Austria and was President of SK Rapid Wien from 1995 until 1999.

References

External links

1943 births
Living people
Association football forwards
Austrian footballers
Austria international footballers
Austrian expatriate footballers
Expatriate footballers in France
Ligue 1 players
OGC Nice players
SK Rapid Wien players
FC Admira Wacker Mödling players
Austrian expatriate sportspeople in France